Year 1072 (MLXXII) was a leap year starting on Sunday (link will display the full calendar) of the Julian calendar.

Events 
 By place 

 Byzantine Empire 
 June 29 – Romanos IV (Diogenes), deposed emperor of the Byzantine Empire, is blinded and sent into exile to the island of Proti (in the Sea of Marmara) at the Monastery of Transfiguration. A few days before his death, he receives a letter from Michael Psellos (his political advisor), congratulating him on the loss of his eyes.

 Europe 
 January 10 – The Normans under Robert Guiscard and his brother Roger I (Boso) conquer Palermo (after a one year siege). Roger receives the keys of the city, and Robert invests him with the title of Count of Sicily. The Emirate of Sicily rules only the southern part of the island, with Syracuse as the capital (until 1091).
 January – Battle of Golpejera: King Sancho II (the Strong) defeats the Castilian forces of his brother Alfonso VI (the Brave) near Carrión de los Condes. Alfonso is captured, but released into exile, where he seeks refuge in the Taifa of Toledo (under the protection of his vassal, Emir Al-Mamun).
 October 7 – Alfonso VI becomes king of León and Castile, following the assassination of Sancho II. He is bestowed with the title of "Emperor of Spain", and is forced by Rodrigo Diaz de Vivar (El Cid), the standard-bearer of Sancho, to take an oath denying any involvement in his brother's death.

 England 
 May 27 – The Accord of Winchester establishes the primacy of the Archbishop of Canterbury over the Archbishop of York, in the Church of England.
 King William I (the Conqueror) invades Scotland and receives the submission of King Malcolm III. He agrees to sign the Treaty of Abernethy.

 Seljuk Empire 
 December 15 – Sultan Alp Arslan (Heroic Lion) dies after a 9-year reign (during his campaign in Transoxiana). He is succeeded by his 17-year-old son Malik-Shah I, who is declared new ruler of the Seljuk Empire. Qavurt, a brother of Alp Arslan, claims the Seljuk throne for himself and occupies the capital of Isfahan.

 China 
 Shen Kuo, Chinese polymathic scientist and statesman, is appointed as the head official for the Bureau of Astronomy – where he begins his work with the colleague Wei Pu on accurately plotting the orbital paths of the stars, planets, and moon three times a night, for a continuum of five years.
 Fall – Shen Kuo is sent to supervise Wang Anshi's program of surveying the building of silt deposits in the Bian Canal, outside the capital city of Kaifeng. Using an original technique, Shen successfully dredges the canal and demonstrates the formidable value of the silt gathered as a fertilizer.

 By topic 

 Literature 
 Dīwān Lughāt al-Turk, an informative book written by Mahmud al-Kashgari about  the Turks, is presented to the ruler of the Kara-Khanid Khanate.

Births 
 Agnes of Aquitaine, queen of Aragon and Navarre (d. 1097)
 Agnes of Waiblingen, daughter of Henry IV (or 1073)
 Welf II (or Welfhard), duke of Bavaria (d. 1120)
 Wulfhilde of Saxony, German noblewoman (d. 1126)

Deaths 
 February 1 – Lý Thánh Tông, Vietnamese emperor (b. 1023)
 February 7 – Diarmait mac Máel na mBó, king of Leinster
 February 22 
 Peter Damian, cardinal-bishop of Ostia (or 1073)
 Stigand, archbishop of Canterbury
 March 16 – Adalbert, archbishop of Hamburg
 March 28 – Ordulf (or Otto), duke of Saxony
 August 19 – Hawise, duchess of Brittany
 September 22 – Ouyang Xiu, Chinese historian and poet (b. 1007)
 October 7 – Sancho II, king of Castile and León 
 October 15 – Æthelric, bishop of Durham
 November 13 – Adalbero III, German nobleman
 November 24 – Bagrat IV, king of Georgia (b. 1018)
 December 15 – Alp Arslan, sultan of the Seljuk Empire (b. 1029)
 Al-Qushayri, Persian Sufi scholar and theologian (or 1073)
 Honorius II, antipope of the Catholic Church
 Maredudd ab Owain ab Edwin, Welsh prince
 Otloh of Sankt Emmeram, German monk (approximate date)
 Qatran Tabrizi, Persian poet and writer (b. 1009)
 Romanos IV, emperor of the Byzantine Empire
 Serlo II of Hauteville (or Sarlo), Norman nobleman

References